Ravu is a 2013 Indian bilingual Malayalam drama film co-written, produced and directed by Ajit Ravi Pegasus. The film stars himself in the lead role, alongside Sanam Shetty, Nancy Gupta, Vinu Abraham and Sajimon Parayil. The Tamil version of the film titled Thottal Vidathu was released a year later in August 2014.

Cast 
Ajit Ravi Pegasus as Sanjay
Sanam Shetty as Sanjana
Nancy Gupta as Nancy
Vinu Abraham
Sajimon Parayil as Thambi
Bibin George
Krishnachandran
Vanitha Krishnachandran

Production 
Ajit Ravi Pegasus, a media personality and beauty pageant organiser, announced the project in September 2012 and stated it was a "dream coming true" to be making a film. A bilingual in Malayalam and Tamil, Ravu was predominantly shot in Kochi. The film featured models Sanam Shetty and Nancy Gupta in lead roles, with both actresses being offered the characters after working with Ajit Ravi during his beauty pageants.

Release and reception 
The Malayalam version of the film was released in 2013.

The Tamil version of the film titled Thottal Vidathu was released in August 2014. A critic from Maalai Malar gave the film a negative review. A further critic from IFlicks.com noted Ajit Ravi "could have portrayed his role better" and "needed to work more on the pace of the movie."

References 

2010s Tamil-language films
2013 films
Indian action drama films
2010s Malayalam-language films
Indian multilingual films